James Eoin Stephen Paul McKeown (born 24 January 1966), better known as Jimeoin (pronounced "Jim Owen"), is an English-born Irish comedian and actor.

Jimeoin rose to prominence in the early 1990s in Australia, where he had his own TV show and where he still resides. He came to public attention in the UK between 2005 and 2008 while performing a tour of Australia's outback and major cities, which was filmed for the BBC Northern Ireland documentary Jimeoin Down Under. He has also gained international recognition and is a frequent performer at comedy festivals, including the Edinburgh Fringe, where he made his debut in 1993 and where he has since appeared every year.

Early life
James Eoin Stephen Paul McKeown was born in Leamington Spa on 24 January 1966, the son of Irish parents. He grew up in the Northern Irish town of Portstewart, where he attended Dominican College. After working on building sites in London for four years, he moved to Australia at the age of 22 and found work as a gardener.

Career
Jimeoin's UK television appearances include Sunday Night at the Palladium (ITV1), Live at the Apollo (BBC1), 8 Out of 10 Cats (Channel 4), The Royal Variety Performance (ITV), Channel 4's O2 Comedy Gala, Dave's One Night Stand, Edinburgh Comedy Festival – Live! (BBC3, three consecutive years), Monumental (BBC NI team captain, series I and II), Michael McIntyre's Comedy Roadshow (BBC1). He has also appeared on the Conan O'Brien Show in the US as well on a number of international specials for Montreal's Just for Laughs. in 2016 he guested on John Lloyd's Museum of Curiosity for BBC Radio 4.

He both starred in and co-wrote two Australian feature film comedies, The Craic (1999) and The Extra (2005), both co-starring Bob Franklin. He had his own comedy television programme, the eponymous Jimeoin (1994–95) which ran for three seasons. He played Convict Griffin in the sitcom Bligh (1992).

He is also known for his extensive live comedy tours in Australia, New Zealand, Ireland, and the United Kingdom. In 2013 he made his solo debut at London's Hammersmith Apollo and began to take his tours into the arenas, starting with the Belfast Odyssey Arena.

In 2010 he completed a new series Jimeoin: Over the Top for The Comedy Channel on Foxtel and Austar. The series features Jimeoin travelling across sections of northern Australia, interspersed with stand-up routines recorded at towns visited along the way.

During the 2014 FIFA World Cup, Jimeoin hosted Australian TV SBS's primetime comedy programme The Full Brazilian, teaming up with the network's live coverage of 2014's World Cup games. The 25 live-to-air, hour-long shows were a mix of Jimeoin's stand-up, sketches, chat, football talk via satellite link to Rio de Janeiro, musical acts and guest comedians.

Personal life
Jimeoin married Catherine Arena in 2000, and they reside in Melbourne with their four children. He is a fan of Australian football team South Melbourne FC. He said in a 2009 interview that he is "not really into that nationality thing" but revealed that he supports the Australian national football team, as well as rooting for Australia in other sports, because "Ireland's shit at everything".

Discography

Albums

Singles

DVDs

Filmography

Movies
 The Perfumer (1997) – Edward Pinchbeck
 The Craic (1999) – Fergus Montagu (also writer/producer)
 You Can't Stop the Murders (2003) – Burrito
 The Extra (2005) – The Extra (also writer)
 That's Not My Dog! (2018) – Self

Television and radio

As himself

Awards and nominations

ARIA Music Awards
The ARIA Music Awards are a set of annual ceremonies presented by Australian Recording Industry Association (ARIA), which recognise excellence, innovation, and achievement across all genres of the music of Australia. They commenced in 1987. 

! 
|-
| 1994 || Goin' Off||rowspan="5"| ARIA Award for Best Comedy Release ||  ||rowspan="5"|
|-
| 1995 || Crack ||  
|-
| 1998 || Forklift Truck ||  
|-
| 2005 || Third Drawer Down ||  
|-
| 2010 || Jimeoin on Ice Live ||

References

External links
Jimeoin's official website

1966 births
Living people
Stand-up comedians from Northern Ireland
Male television actors from Northern Ireland
Male comedians from Northern Ireland
People from Portstewart
People from Leamington Spa
People educated at Dominican College, Portstewart
Australian male comedians
Television writers from Northern Ireland
British male television writers
20th-century comedians from Northern Ireland
21st-century comedians from Northern Ireland
Male actors from County Londonderry